The Tephromelataceae are a family of lichenized fungi in the order Lecanorales. The family was circumscribed by Austrian lichenologist Josef Hafellner in 1984. Tephromelataceae comprises the genera Tephromela, Calvitimela, Mycoblastus and Violella, which together constitute a well-supported monophyletic group.

The family Mycoblastaceae, proposed by Hafellner to contain the genus Mycoblastus, was also published in the same 1984 publication; it was later placed into synonymy with Tephromelataceae. The latter name takes precedence because of its first adopted use.

Genera
Tephromelataceae contains 4 genera and about 53 species. This is a list of the genera contained within the Tephromelataceae; following the genus name is the taxonomic authority, year of publication, and the number of species:

Calvitimela  – 11 spp.
Mycoblastus  – 10 spp.
Tephromela  – ca. 30 spp.
Violella  – 2 spp.

References

Lecanoromycetes families
Lecanorales
Lichen families
Taxa named by Josef Hafellner
Taxa described in 1984